The cochlear cupula is a structure in the cochlea. It is the apex of the cochlea.
The bony canal of the cochlea takes two and three-quarter turns around the modiolus. The modiolus is about 30 mm in length, and diminishes gradually in diameter from the base to the summit, where it terminates in the cupula.

Auditory system